The Eparchy of Lutsk–Ostroh (Lutsk–Ostroh of the Ukrainians) was a suffragan eparchy of the Metropolis of Kiev, Galicia and all Ruthenia in the Ruthenian Uniate Church and the  Ukrainian Greek Catholic Church. It was situated in the Polish–Lithuanian Commonwealth (1594-1636, 1702-1795 and 1789-1839). Later, it was an Eastern Catholic titular see from 1921 to 1973.
 
Remarkably, its Latin title always called it 'Ruthenenian' (Catholic), which is now a distinct Byzantine rite Eastern Catholic (then 'Uniate') particular church sui iurus.

History 
 It was established as a uniate see when it joined the Union of Brest on 1594.05.02 as the Eparchy (Diocese) of Lutsk–Ostroh / Luc’k–Ostrog (Curiate Italian) / Luceorien(sis) et Ostrogien(sis) Ruthenorum (Latin adjective), without Latin precursor, but rooted as former Ruthenian Orthodox Church jurisdiction
 Suppressed in 1636, without direct Catholic successor, with the help of the King of Poland Władysław IV Vasa, but the eparchy was 'returned' to the Orthodox community. From then the remaining Uniate (Catholic) parishes and several monasteries were administered by the Archimandrite of the Zhydychyn Saint Nicholas's Monastery.
 Restored in 1702 as Eparchy (Diocese) of Lutsk–Ostroh / Luc’k–Ostrog (Curiate Italian) / Luceorien(sis) et Ostrogien(sis) Ruthenorum (Latin)
 Suppressed again in 1795, without direct Catholic successor 
 Restored 1798.11.18 as Eparchy (Diocese) of Lutsk–Ostroh / Luc’k–Ostrog (Curiate Italian) / Luceorien(sis) et Ostrogien(sis) Ruthenorum (Latin)
 Suppressed again in 1839.03.14, without direct Catholic successor
See below for its 20th-century restoration as Episcopal Titular see and for its current successor and/or 'restoration', the Archiepiscopal Exarchate of Lutsk.

Residential Episcopal Ordinaries 
(all Ukrainian Rite)

Suffragan Eparchs (Bishops) of Lutsk–Ostroh 
(incomplete first decades?)
 Cyril Terlecki (1594.05.02 – death 1608)
 Eustachy Maliński (1609 – death 1621)
 Jeremiasz Poczapowski (1621? – death 1636.10.15)
See suppressed 1636-1702
 Dionizy Żabokrzycki (1702 – death 1714)
 Cyryl Szumlański (1715 – death 1715)
 Józef Wyhowski (1716 – death 1730)
 Teodozy Rudnicki-Lubieniecki (1731 – death 1751)
 Stefan Sylwester Rudnicki-Lubieniecki (1752 – death 1777)
 Cyprian Stecki (1777.05.12 – death 1787.01.05)
 Michał Mateusz Konstanty Stadnicki (1787.01.05 – 1795), death 1797.06.26; succeeded as former Coadjutor Bishop of Lutsk–Ostroh of the Ukrainians (? – 1787.01.05)
See suppressed 1795-78
 Stefan Lewiński (1797.06.26 – death 1806.01.23); previously Titular Bishop of Tegea (1784.08.17 – 1797.06.26) as Auxiliary Bishop of the Metropolitan Archeparchy Kyiv–Halyč of the Ukrainians (Ukraine) (1784.08.17 – 1790?), Coadjutor Bishop of Lutsk–Ostroh of the Ukrainians (Ukraine) (1790? – succession 1797.06.26)
 Hryhorij Koxanovyc (Grzegorz Kochanowicz) (1807 – 1814), previously Auxiliary Bishop of Lutsk–Ostroh of the Ukrainians (1798.04.20 – 1807); later Eparch (Bishop) of Vilnius of the Ukrainians (Lithuania) (1809 – 1810), Metropolitan Archbishop of Kyiv–Halyč of the Ukrainians (Ukraine) (1810 – death 1814)
 Jakub Martusiewicz (1817 – 1826), next Archeparch (Archbishop) of Polatsk–Vitebsk of the Ruthenians (Belarus) (1826 – death 1833.01.26)
 Archbishop-bishop Ivan Krasovskyj (Jan Krassowski) (1826 – 1827.08.23); previously Archeparch (Archbishop) of Polatsk–Vitebsk of the Ruthenians (Belarus) (1809.09.22 – 1826)
See suppressed 1839

Titular see 
 In 1921 the eparchy was nominally restored as Latin Titular bishopric of Lutsk–Ostroh / Luc’k–Ostrog (Curiate Italian) / Luceorien(sis) et Ostrogien(sis) Ruthenorum (Latin)
 In 1973 it was suppressed, having had only the following incumbents, both of the fitting Episcopal (lowest) rank :
 Blessed Bishop Vasyl VeIyčkovskyj, Redemptorists (C.SS.R.) (1959 – death 1973.06.30) as Auxiliary Bishop of the Metropolitan Archeparchy Lviv of the Ukrainians (Ukraine) (1959 – 1973.06.30)
 Josyf Botsian (1921.02.24 – death 1926.11.21), also as Auxiliary Bishop of Lviv of the Ukrainians (1924.09.20 – 1926.11.21).

 It is considered to be restored as residential see (albeit demoted to pre-diocesan rank) in 2008.01.15 as Ukrainian Catholic Archiepiscopal Exarchate of Lutsk / Luc’k (Italian) / Luceorien(sis) Ucrainorum (Latin), on territory split off from the Major Archdiocese of Kyiv–Halyč.

See also 
 List of Catholic dioceses in Ukraine
 Ukrainian Catholic Archiepiscopal Exarchate of Lutsk

References

Sources and external links 
 GCatholic.org - data for all sections
 Lutsk eparchy at Encyclopedia of Ukraine

Lutsk
Metropolis of Kiev, Galicia and all Ruthenia (Ruthenian Uniate Church)
Eparchies of the Ruthenian Uniate Church
Lutsk
History of Volyn Oblast
History of Rivne Oblast
1594 establishments
Religious organizations established in the 1590s
16th-century establishments in Poland
16th-century establishments in Ukraine
1839 disestablishments
Religious organizations disestablished in the 19th century
19th-century disestablishments in Poland
19th-century disestablishments in the Russian Empire